Allan Roy Sefton BEM (1921 – 2 May 1989) was an Australian ornithologist, naturalist and environmentalist.  Employed by the steelworks at Port Kembla, much of his spare time was spent studying the natural history, and promoting the environmental conservation, of the Illawarra region of eastern New South Wales.  He was a bird bander and a founder of the New South Wales Albatross Study Group.  Since 1993 he has been commemorated in the Allan Sefton Fund which awards a prize to the best graduate of the Honours Bachelor of Environmental Science Program at the University of Wollongong, and by the annual Allan Sefton Memorial Lecture there.

Honours
 1975 – British Empire Medal, for service to the community
 1978 – Australian Natural History Medallion
 1989 – Medal of the Order of Australia (OAM), for service to conservation
 1989 – Honorary PhD, University of Wollongong, for contributions to environmental science in the Illawarra region

References

1921 births
1989 deaths
Australian conservationists
Australian ornithologists
Recipients of the British Empire Medal
Recipients of the Medal of the Order of Australia
20th-century Australian zoologists